Suvorovskaya is a station under construction on the Koltsevaya Line of the Moscow Metro. It will be connected to Dostoevskaya on the Lyublinsko-Dmitrovskaya Line. The station was deemed to be not economically feasible and construction was cancelled in 2017.

Name 
It is named after Suvorov Square.

History 
Although there was land cleared for the construction of the station, the city elected not to proceed with development of the station. According to Maksim Vasiliev, a manager with MosKomArkhitektura, construction of the station would be too technically complex, too long, and too costly to compete. Consequently, Vasiliev stated that the station was unlikely to be built.  On August 19, 2019, works on Suvorovskaya station construction site resumed.

References

External links 

Moscow Metro stations
Railway stations under construction in Russia
Koltsevaya Line